Agrahara is a village in the southern state of Karnataka, India. It is located in the Hunsur taluk of Mysore district in Karnataka.

See also
 Mysore
 Districts of Karnataka

References

External links

Villages in Mysore district